Prana Snehithulu is a 1988 Indian Telugu-language action drama film directed by V. Madhusudhana Rao. It is a remake of the 1987 Hindi film Khudgarz, which itself was based on Jeffrey Archer's 1979 novel Kane and Abel. The film stars Krishnam Raju, Sarath Babu and Radha.

Cast 
 Krishnam Raju
 Sarath Babu
 Radha
 Suresh
 Mucherla Aruna
 Murali Mohan
 M. Balaiah
 Kota Srinivasa Rao
 Murali Mohan
 Saradhi
 Sagarika
 A. J. V. Prasad
 Lakshmi Priya
 Baby Prasanna Lakshmi

Production 
Prana Snehithulu, directed by V. Madhusudhana Rao, is a remake of the 1987 Hindi film Khudgarz, itself inspired by Jeffrey Archer's 1979 novel Kane and Abel. Shooting took place at Padmalaya Studios.

Soundtrack 

The soundtrack was composed by the duo Raj–Koti while the lyrics were written by Bhuvana Chandra. Audio was released through LEO music.

References

External links 
 

1988 films
1980s Telugu-language films
Indian action drama films
Indian buddy films
Telugu remakes of Hindi films
Films directed by V. Madhusudhana Rao
Films scored by Raj–Koti
1980s action drama films
1980s buddy films